The Winning of Beatrice is a lost 1918 silent film romantic comedy directed by Harry L. Franklin and starring May Allison and Hale Hamilton.

Cast
May Allison - Beatrice Buckley
Hale Hamilton - Robert Howard
Frank Currier - James Buckley
Stephen Grattan - John Maddox, Sr.
John Davidson - John Maddox, R.
Peggy Parr - Millie Nelson
Dean Raymond - Thomas Nelson
Frank Joyner - Henry Jenkins
Ivy Ward - Baby Jenkins

References

External links

1918 films
American silent feature films
Lost American films
1918 romantic comedy films
American black-and-white films
Metro Pictures films
Films directed by Harry L. Franklin
1918 lost films
Lost romantic comedy films
1910s American films
Silent American comedy films
1910s English-language films
Silent romantic comedy films